Breivig is a village on Lewis in the Outer Hebrides, Scotland. Breivig is within the parish of Stornoway.

According to Magne Oftedal's 'The Village Names of Lewis in the Outer Hebrides' (Oslo, 1954), the name Brèibhig is derived from the Old Norse Breiðvík ('broad bay').

References

External links

Canmore - Breivig, Lewis site record

Villages in the Isle of Lewis